Dinting is a district of Glossop in Derbyshire, England. The district falls within the Simmondley ward of the High Peak Council. It is a small village and has no shops, other than a fish and chip takeaway; the nearest are in neighbouring Glossop or Hadfield. There is a small primary school, Dinting C of E, located near the viaduct. The 1st Dinting Scout Group has been very active since 1938.

Transport

The village is served by Dinting railway station, on the Glossop Line between Glossop, Hadfield and Manchester Piccadilly. The station has a generally half-hourly service in both directions.

It is notable for the Dinting Arches, a viaduct which carries the railway over Glossop Brook.

The Dinting Railway Centre was run by the Bahamas Locomotive Society until it closed in 1991, due to leasing difficulties. The museum moved to Ingrow (West) station, alongside the line at the Keighley and Worth Valley Railway. .

Notable residents
 Blessed Nicholas Garlick, Catholic priest and martyr, was born here c. 1555.

See also
Listed buildings in Glossop

References

 

Villages in Derbyshire
Towns and villages of the Peak District
Glossop
High Peak, Derbyshire